The 1959 Wyoming Cowboys football team was an American football team that represented the University of Wyoming as a member of the Skyline Conference during the 1959 NCAA University Division football season. In their third season under head coach Bob Devaney, the Cowboys compiled a 9–1 record (7–0 against Skyline opponents), won the Skyline Conference championship, and outscored opponents by a total of 287 to 62. The Cowboys were not ranked during the season, but after the season concluded they were ranked No. 16 in the final AP Poll.

The Cowboys ranked fourth out of 112 teams in major college football in scoring offense with an average of 28.7 points per game. They also ranked fifth in scoring defense, allowing an average of 6.2 points per game.

The team's statistical leaders included Jim Walden with 882 passing yards, Jerry Hill with 579 rushing yards and 50 points scored, and Dick Hamilton with 245 receiving yards. Jim Walden went on to play in the Canadian Football League for the BC Lions, Calgary Stampeders, and Edmonton Eskimos. Jerry Hill played 10 seasons in the National Football League with the Baltimore Colts.

Two players were named to the 1959 All-Skyline Conference team: guard Len Kuczewski; and quarterback Jim Walden.

Schedule

References

Wyoming
Wyoming Cowboys football seasons
Mountain States Conference football champion seasons
Wyoming Cowboys